Lumino is a settlement in the Eastern Region of Uganda.

Location
The coordinates of Lumino are 0°19'30.0"N, 33°59'45.0"E (Latitude:0.324997, Longitude:33.995831).

Population
The 27 August 2014 national census enumerated the population of Lumino sub-county at 14,624.

Landmarks
The landmarks within the town limits or close to the edges of town include:

See also
Busia District, Uganda
Majanji

References

External links
 Water Supply And Water Use In Lumino, Southeast Uganda

Populated places in Uganda
Cities in the Great Rift Valley
Busia District, Uganda